Charlotte Mosher "Carlie" Geer (born November 13, 1957 in Greenwich, Connecticut) is a rower from the United States.

Olympics
Geer and her sister qualified for the 1980 U.S. Olympic team but neither was able to compete due to the U.S. Olympic Committee's boycott of the 1980 Summer Olympics in Moscow, Russia. They both received a Congressional Gold Medal many years later as consolation. She competed for the United States in the 1984 Summer Olympics held in Los Angeles, California in the single sculls event where she finished in second place.

A family of Olympians
Carlie's sister Julia "Judy" Geer competed in the 1976 and 1984 Olympics for the American rowing teams, her brother-in-law Richard "Dick" Dreissigacker competed as a rower in the 1972 Summer Olympics, and her nieces Hannah and Emily competed in biathlon in the 2014 Winter Olympics and 2018 Winter Olympics, respectively.

References

1957 births
Living people
American female rowers
Olympic silver medalists for the United States in rowing
Rowers at the 1984 Summer Olympics
Medalists at the 1984 Summer Olympics
Congressional Gold Medal recipients
21st-century American women